United Federation may refer to:

Organizations
United Federation of Postal Clerks, the former name of the American Postal Workers Union
United Federation of Teachers, a labor union that represents most teachers in New York City's public schools
United Federation of Trade Unions, a trade union in Norway
United Retail Federation, an Australian industrial organisation of employers

In fiction
United Federation of Planets, a fictional interstellar federal republic in the Star Trek science fiction franchise
United Citizen Federation, a fictional government from the movie Starship Troopers
United Federations, a fictional government from the movie The Fifth Element
United Federation, a territory in Papers, Please
United Federation, a fictional country from the Sonic the Hedgehog franchise